Nuria Párrizas Díaz is a Spanish professional tennis player. She has been ranked as high as world No. 45 in singles by the Women's Tennis Association (WTA), which she first achieved in March 2022, and 320 in doubles, attained in September 2022.

Career

Early years
Párrizas Díaz started playing tennis when she was six years old. Until the age of 14, she trained in her hometown. At that age, the Andalusian Tennis Federation awarded her a scholarship to train at their facilities in Seville and compete throughout Spain in the children's and cadet tournaments.

2007–2016: Professional debut, injury and hiatus
At the age of 16, she began to play in the Futures tournaments, both nationally and internationally. Párrizas Díaz then relocated to live and train in Barcelona, at the Hispano Francés Academy.

However, due to a lack of professional support, she decided to return to Granada where she continued training and attending ITF tournaments, until she was 22 years old when she went to train in Italy. A major shoulder injury caused her career to come to a halt when she was among the top 300 in the WTA rankings. 

At 24 years old, the doctors suggested to Párrizas Díaz to retire from tennis. However, she managed to recover, and despite not having sponsors, she looked for a way to compete professionally.

2017–2019: Return to tour, two ITF Circuit titles
After her return in 2017, she won about a dozen ITF tournaments and also played in club leagues in Spain (Stadium Casablanca), Italy (Rocco Polimeni) and Germany (Esslingen).

In 2019, Párrizas Díaz decided to go back to training in Valencia to boost her career. She had a good year, already settled in $25k tournaments and above of the ITF Circuit, where she managed to add two titles of that level (the first of this level) and get very close to the top 200.

2020–2021: WTA, top 100 and Grand Slam debut
In January 2020, Párrizas Díaz participated in her first Grand Slam event after years of battle when she played the qualifying for the Australian Open.

In April 2021, Párrizas Díaz qualified for the Copa Colsanitas tournament, with two solid wins. This would be her first main-draw appearance at the WTA-level.

In July, she won her biggest title to date at the WTA 125 Swedish Open in Bastad, defeating Olga Govortsova in the final. As a result, she reached a new career-high of 108.

In August, she won her biggest ITF title at the $100k Tennis Challenge in Landisville, Pennsylvania. As a result, she entered the top 100 at world No. 96, on 16 August 2021.

She qualified for a Grand Slam main draw at the US Open for the first time in her career.

Finally in September, Párrizas Díaz won her second WTA 125 title at the Columbus Challenger, the inaugural women's version of the event. She defeated Wang Xinyu in the final, achieving a new career-high ranking of 73. She lost to Wang in the doubles final.

2022: Australian Open third round, top 50 debut
She reached the third round of a Grand Slam championship for the first time in her career at the 2022 Australian Open, after the withdrawal of Maryna Zanevska. As a result, she made her top-50 debut on 7 February 2022.

In the American swing, she entered the main draw as a lucky loser at the two WTA 1000 tournaments, the National Bank Open, where she lost to Serena Williams, and the Western & Southern Open, where she lost to Tereza Martincová both in the first round.

Performance timeline

Only main-draw results in WTA Tour, Grand Slam tournaments, Fed Cup/Billie Jean King Cup and Olympic Games are included in win–loss records.

Singles
Current after the 2023 Monterrey Open.

Doubles

WTA 125 tournament finals

Singles: 2 (2 titles)

Doubles: 1 (runner-up)

ITF Circuit finals

Singles: 38 (22 titles, 16 runner–ups)

Doubles: 9 (3 titles, 6 runner–ups)

Notes

References

External links
 
 

1991 births
Living people
Spanish female tennis players
Sportspeople from Granada
Tennis players from Andalusia